Sabaudia is a coastal town in the province of Latina, Lazio, in central Italy. Sabaudia's centre is characterised by several examples of Fascist architecture.
Villa Volpi, a neoclassical seaside villa built for Countess Nathalie Volpi of Misurata, is located on the sand dunes of Sabaudia.

History

In ancient Roman times, the extensive Villa of Domitian was built nearby and embellished by the emperor. Some of its remains have been excavated. 

It is one of several towns built on the reclaimed marshland of the ancient Pontine Marshes, Agro Pontino. This marsh was drained under orders from Benito Mussolini. Vast tracts of malaria-infested swamp were drained by workers transported from poor areas of northern Italy, leaving the coastal area south of Rome with rich farmland. These towns were built so that the fascist regime could demonstrate the draining of the marshland, as well as to provide housing communities for the increasing urban populations of Italy's large cities.

Architects Gino Cancellotti, Eugenio Montuori, Luigi Piccinato, and Alfredo Scalpelli were responsible for the town plan and many of the buildings after winning a competition for the design of Sabaudia, sponsored by Mussolini.  Work commenced on the town's construction on 5 August 1933 and was completed 253 days later. The city itself is based on a rectangular grid road layout and rationalist architecture.

Beaches
Sabaudia is well frequented by residents of Rome and Naples, as it is about halfway between the two cities. Sabaudia has 15 km of beach that boast the Bandiera Blu (Blue Flag) designation, which is awarded by the Foundation for Environmental Education (FEE). The FEE grades a beach based on the quality of water, recycling and waste management practices, the presence of lifeguards, and inclusion of pedestrian paths and green areas. Surrounded by the Circeo Forest, access is provided by a boardwalk along the entire coast.

Twin towns / sister cities 
  Saint-Médard-en-Jalles, France
  El Vendrell, Spain

References

Sources

 The Beaches of Rome: Ultimate Guide dolcevespa.com. Retrieved 2019-07-08

External links

 Sabaudia.net: Sabaudia website
 The Beaches of Rome: Ultimate Guide

 
Cities and towns in Lazio
Coastal towns in Lazio
Italian fascist architecture
Planned cities
Populated places established in 1933
1933 establishments in Italy